Lights in the Sky: Over North America 2008 Tour Sampler is an EP compilation by Nine Inch Nails, Deerhunter, Crystal Castles, Does It Offend You, Yeah? and A Place to Bury Strangers, promoting the Lights in the Sky Tour of Nine Inch Nails in 2008. It was released as a free digital download on June 5, 2008. It features one track from each supporting artist, as well as the track "Echoplex" from The Slip.

The EP is labeled Seed 05, – a sister system to the Nine Inch Nails halo numbers catalog system.

Track listing

References

Nine Inch Nails compilation albums
Deerhunter albums
Crystal Castles (band) albums
Does It Offend You, Yeah? albums
A Place to Bury Strangers albums
Sampler albums
Albums produced by Trent Reznor
2008 compilation albums
Albums free for download by copyright owner
The Null Corporation compilation albums